This is the discography for the American Drummer/Musician Steve Gadd. This discography contains original studio and live album releases. It does not include singles, EPs, unofficial releases, greatest hits/best of compilations or video only releases.

As Blicher Hemmer Gadd 
 Blicher Hemmer Gadd (C-Nut, 2014)
 Omara (C-Nut, 2018)
 Get That Motor Runnin''' (C-Nut, 2019)

 As The Boys From Rochester 
 The Boys From Rochester (Feels So Good Records, 1989)

 As The Chick Corea + Steve Gadd Band 
 Chinese Butterfly (Stretch, 2017)

 As Steve Gadd + Eddie Gomez + Ronnie Cuber + WDR Big Band 
 Center Stage (Leopard|Leopard, 2022)

 As The Gaddabouts 
 The Gaddabouts (RacecarLOTTA Records, 2011)
 Look Out Now! (RacecarLOTTA Records, 2012)

 As Mika & Steve Gadd 
 Mikarimba! (Video Arts Japan/Zoom, 2010)

 As Steve Gadd Band 
 Gaddabout (Electric Bird, 1984)
 Gadditude (BFM Jazz, 2013) 
 70 Strong (BFM Jazz, 2015) 
 Way Back Home (Live from Rochester, NY) (BFM Jazz, 2016) 
 Steve Gadd Band (BFM Jazz, 2018) 
 At Blue Note Tokyo (BFM Jazz, 2021)

 As Steve Gadd & Friends 
 Live at Voce – Deluxe Edition (BFM Jazz, 2010)

 As The Gadd Gang 
 Gaddabout (Electric Bird, 1984) 
 The Gadd Gang (Columbia, 1986)
 Here & Now (Columbia, 1988) 
 Live at Bottom Line (A Touch, 1994)

 As Hyper Ventures 
 Hyper Ventures (InsideOut, 1992)

 As Anders Wihk Steve Gadd Svante Henryson 
 Same Tree Different Fruit (Lionheart/Videoarts, 2012)

 With 10cc 
 Windows in the Jungle (Mercury, 1983)

 With Aquarium 
 Top (M2, 2021)

 With Alessi 
 All for a Reason (A&M, 1977)

 With Peter Allen 
 Continental American (A&M, 1974)

 With Herb Alpert 
 Beyond (A&M Records, 1980)
 Blow Your Own Horn (track 1 only) (A&M, 1983)

 With Laurie Anderson 
 Strange Angels (Warner Bros, 1989)

 With Arthur, Hurley & Gottlieb 
 Arther, Hurley & Gottlieb (Columbia, 1973)

 With Ashford & Simpson 
 Come As You Are (Warner Bros, 1976)
 So So Satisfied (Warner Bros, 1977)  
 Stay Free (Warner Bros, 1979)
 High Rise (Capitol Records, 1983)

 With Patti Austin
 End of a Rainbow (CTI, 1976)

 With Aztec Camera 
 Love (On track "Paradise") (Sire, 1987)

 With Philip Bailey 
 Love Will Find a Way (Verve Records, 2019)

 With Chet Baker 
 She Was Too Good to Me (CTI, 1974)

 With Chet Baker Jim Hall Hubert Laws 
 Studio Trieste, (CTI 9007, 1982)

 With Tony Banks 
 The Fugitive (tracks "Man of Spells", "And the Wheels Keep Turning", "By You", and "Sometime Never") (Charisma UK, Atlantic, US, 1983)

 With Gato Barbieri 
 Ruby, Ruby, (A&M, 1977) (Track: "Sunrise")

 With Ray Barretto 
 La Cuna (CTI Records, 1981)

 With Keith Barrow 
 Just As I Am (Capitol Records, 1980)

 With Bazuka 
 Bazuka (A&M, 1975)

 With Joe Beck 
 Friends (DMP, 1984)

 With Bee Gees 
 Living Eyes (RSO, 1981)

 With Maggie Bell 
 Queen of the Night, (Atlantic, 1974) With George Benson 
 Bad Benson (CTI, 1974)
 In Concert-Carnegie Hall (CTI, 1976)
 Good King Bad (CTI, 1976)
 Livin' Inside Your Love (Warner Bros, 1979) 
 Pacific Fire (CTI, 1983)  
 In Your Eyes (Warner Bros, 1983) 
 Absolute Benson (GRP/Verve, 2000)

 With Bob Berg 
 Riddles (Stretch, 1994)

 With Warren Bernhardt 
 Manhattan Update (Arista Novus, 1980)

 With Randy Bernsen 
 Mo' Wasabi (Zebra Records, 1986) 
 Paradise Citizens (Zebra Records, 1988)

 With Stephen Bishop 
 Red Cab to Manhattan (Track 4 only) (Warner Bros, 1980)

 With Marc Black 
 Stroke of Genius (Suma, 2006)
 Pictures of The Highway (Suma, 2010)

 With John Blair 
 We Belong Together (CTI, 1977)

 With Carla Bley 
 Dinner Music (Watt/ECM, 1977)

 With Rory Block 
 Turning Point (Zensor/Amalthea/Munich Records BV, 1989)

 With Angela Bofill 
 Angie (GRP, 1978)

 With Luiz Bonfá 
 Manhattan Strut (Paddle Wheel, 1997) (The Steve Gadd official discography has this as a 1988 release, however the original recording date is believed to be 1974)

 With Brecker Brothers Back to Back (Arista, 1976) Don't Stop the Music (Arista, 1977) Detente (Arista, 1980)

 With Edie Brickell 
 Picture Perfect Morning (Geffen Records, 1994)
 Volcano (Cherry Records/Universal, 2003)

 With Willy Bridges Bridges to Cross (Buddah Records, 1977)

 With Brigati 
 Lost in the Wilderness (Elektra, 1976)

 With Jonatha Brooke 
 The Works (Bad Dog Records, 2008)
 My Mother has 4 Noses (Bad Dog Records, 2014)

 With Alison Brown 
 The Song of the Banjo (Compass Records, 2015)

 With Joe Brucato 
 Free (Number 44, 2007)

 With Rusty Bryant 
 For the Good Times (Prestige, 1973)

 With Kate Bush 
 Director's Cut (Fish People/EMI, 2011)
 50 Words for Snow (Fish People, 2011)

 With Ed Calle 
 Double Talk (Columbia, 1996)

 With Larry Carlton 
 Sleepwalk (Warner Bros, 1982)

 With Karen Carpenter 
 Karen Carpenter (A&M, 1996)

 With Paul Carrack 
 These Days (Carrack-UK, 2018)

 With Barbara Carroll 
 From the Beginning (United Artists Records, 1977)

 With Milton Chesley Carroll 
 Milton Chesley Carroll (RCA, 1972)

 With Ron Carter 
 Anything Goes (Kudo, 1975)
 Yellow & Green (Steve Gadd only appears on bonus tracks 7 & 8 of the 1987 re-issue and was not on the original 1976 release) (Epic, 1987)

 With Mike Catalano 
 A Rio Affair (MARACUJAZZ, 1990)
 A Manhattan Affair (Catman Records, 2007)

 With Harry Chapin 
 Dance Band on the Titanic (Elektra, 1977)

 With Tracy Chapman 
 Our Bright Future (Elektra, 2008)

 With Ray Charles 
 My World (Warner Bros, 1993)

 With Chevy Chase 
 Chevy Chase (Arista, 1980)

 With Cyrus Chestnut 
 A Charlie Brown Christmas (Atlantic, 2000)

 With The Choice 4 
 The Choice 4 (RCA Victor, 1975)

 With Tony Cicco 
 Pá (RCA/RCA Italiana, 1989)

 With Cinque 
 Catch A Corner (Alma Records, 2012)

 With Chiara Civello 
 Last Quarter Moon (Verve, 2005)

 With Eric Clapton 
 Pilgrim (Reprise, 1998)
 Reptile (Reprise, 2001) 
 One More Car, One More Rider (Duck/Reprise, 2002) 
 Me and Mr. Johnson (Reprise, 2004) 
 Sessions for Robert J. (Reprise, 2004)
 Back Home (Duck/Reprise, 2005)
 Old Sock (Surfdog/Duck Records/ADA U.S. Polydor EU, 2013)
 Slowhand at 70 - Live at the Royal Albert Hall (Eagle Vision, 2015)
 Crossroads Guitar Festival 2019 (Rhino/Reprise Records, 2020)
 The Lady in the Balcony: Lockdown Sessions (Universal Music Group, 2021)

 With Alain Clark 
 Live It Out (8Ball Music, 2007)
 Colorblind (8Ball Music, 2010)

 With Stanley Clarke 
 Journey to Love (Nemperor, 1975) 
 School Days (Nemperor/Epic, 1976)
 Modern Man (Cymbal first and last track) (Nemperor, 1978) 
 I Wanna Play For You (Nemperor, 1979)

 With Merry Clayton 
 Keep Your Eye on the Sparrow (Ode, 1975)

 With Joe Cocker 
 Stingray (A&M, 1976)
 Luxury You Can Afford (Asylum, 1978)

 With Marc Cohn 
 Marc Cohn (Atlantic, 1991)

 With Mark Colby 
 Serpentine Fire (Zappan Tee Records/Columbia, 1978)
 One Good Turn (Zappan Tee Records, 1979)

 With Natalie Cole 
 Snowfall on the Sahara (Elektra, 1999)

 With Judy Collins 
 Judith (Elektra, 1975)
 Bread and Roses (Elektra, 1976)

 With Michael Colombier 
 Michael Colombier (Chrysalis, 1979)

 With Chick Corea / Return to Forever 
 The Leprechaun (Polydor, 1976) 
 My Spanish Heart (Polydor, 1976)
 The Mad Hatter (Polydor, 1978) 
 Friends (Polydor, 1978) 
 Three Quartets (Stretch Records, 1981) 
 Rendezvous in New York (Stretch Records, 2003)
 The Ultimate Adventure (Stretch Records/Universal, 2006)
 Super Trio - with Chick Corea and Christian McBride (Mad Hatter Productions ,2006)
 Return to the Seventh Galaxy: The Anthology (Although this is mainly a compilation of previously released Return to Forever tracks it contains 3 previously unreleased tracks with Steve Gadd on drums) (Polydor/Verve, 1996)
 Jazz Workshop Boston, MA, May 15, 1973 (Jazz-A-Nova/BSMF Records, 2019)

 With Cory 
 Fire Sign (Phantom Records, 1976)

 With Larry Coryell 
 Difference (on track Memphis Underground) (Egg, 1978)

 With Lou Courtney 
 Buffalo Smoke (RCA Victor, 1976)

 With Hank Crawford 
 I Hear a Symphony (Kudu, 1975) 
 Hank Crawford's Back (Kudu, 1976)
 Tico Rico (Kudu, 1977)  
 Cajun Sunrise (Kudu, 1978)

 With Randy Crawford & Joe Sample 
 Feeling good (PRA, 2007)
 No Regrets (PRA, 2008)
 Randy Crawford & Joe Sample Live with Steve Gadd & Niklas Sample (PRA, 2012)

 With Creme D'Cocoa 
 Funked Up (Venture Records, 1978)

 With Jim Croce 
 I Got a Name (ABC US, Vertigo UK, 1973)

 With Christopher Cross 
 Another Page (Warner Bros, 1983)

 With Beppe Crovella 
 Soulful Traffic (Electromantic Music, 2010)

 With Ronnie Cuber 
 Pin Point (Electric Bird, 1986)

 With Paquito D'Rivera 
 Explosion (Columbia, 1986)

 With Jorge Dalto & Super Friends 
 Rendezvous (Eastworld, 1983)
 New York Nightline (Eastworld, 1984)

 With Pino Daniele 
 Ferryboat (EMI, 1985)
 Schizzechea With Love (EMI/Bagaria, 1988)
 La Grande Madre (Blue Drag, 2012)

 With Eddie Daniels 
 Morning Thunder (Columbia, 1978)

 With Rainy Davis 
 Ouch (Track "Choosey Beggar") (Columbia, 1988)

 With Stu Daye 
 Free Parking (Columbia, 1976)

 With Eumir Deodato 
 First Cuckoo (MCA, 1975)
 Very Together (MCA, 1976)
 Stereo Sounds (WEA, 2007) (This is believed to be a 1980s release, probably 1986, though no source can be found to verify this)

 With Jackie DeShannon 
 Your Baby Is a Lady (Atlantic, 1974)

 With Hermine Deurloo 
 Riverbeast (ZenneZ Records, 2019)

 With Al Di Meola 
 Land of the Midnight Sun (Columbia, 1976) (track "The Wizard")
 Elegant Gypsy, 1977 (tracks "Flight Over Rio" & "Elegant Gypsy Suite")
 Casino (Columbia, 1978)
 Splendido Hotel (CBS/Columbia, 1980) (tracks "Roller Jubilee" & "Spanish Eyes") 
 Electric Rendezvous (Columbia, 1982) 
 Tour De Force – Live (Columbia, 1982) 
 Orange and Blue (tracks "Theme of the Mothership" & "Casmir") (Tomato, 1994)  
 Consequence of Chaos (Telarc, 2006)

 With Disco Kids 
 Disco Kids (Dellwood Records,1979)

 With Smith Dobson 
 Smithzonian (Night Music Productions, 1986)

 With Dane Donohue 
 Dane Donohue (Columbia, 1978)

 With Urszula Dudziak 
 Midnight Rain (Arista, 1977)

 With The Dynamic Superiors 
 The Sky's the Limit (Venture Records, 1980 but unable to provide citation/P-Vine Records, 2003 re-issue)

 With East Bounce 
 East Bounce (One Voice, 1995)

 With William Eaton 
 Struggle Buggy (Marlin, 1977)

 With Eliane Elias Illusions (Denon, 1987)

 With Noel Elmowy 
 Feelin' Good (Expansion Records, 2000) (Track "Shuffle the Deck")

 With Melissa Errico Legrand Affair (Sh-K-Boom Records, 2011)

 With The Explorers 
 The Explorers (Virgin Records, 1985)

 With Jon Faddis 
 Good and Plenty (Buddah Records/Arista, 1979)

 With Faith Hope and Charity Life Goes On (RCA Victor, 1976)

 With Georgie Fame Cool Cat Blues (Go Jazz, 1989)

 With Dominick Farinacci 
 Short Stories (Mack Avenue Records, 2016)

 With Art Farmer Crawl Space (CTI, 1977)Big Blues with Jim Hall (CTI, 1978)Yama with Joe Henderson (CTI, 1979)

 With Joe Farrell 
 Penny Arcade (CTI Records, 1973) 
 Upon This Rock (CTI Records, 1974)
 La Catedral Y El Toro (Warner Bros, 1977)

 With Don Felder 
 American Rock 'n' Roll (BMG, 2019)

 With Steve Feldman 
 Steve Feldman (Evolution, 1973)

 With Maynard Ferguson Primal Scream (Columbia, 1976)

 With Roberta Flack 
 Blue Lights in the Basement (Atlantic, 1977)
 Roberta Flack (album) (Atlantic, 1978)
 I'm the one (Atlantic, 1982)
 Oasis (Atlantic, 1988)

 With David Foster 
 River of Love (Rhino/Atlantic, 1990)

 With Aretha Franklin
 With Everything I Feel in Me (Atlantic, 1974)

 With Michael Franks 
 Burchfield Nines (Warner Bros, 1978)
 Passionfruit (Warner Bros, 1983)
 Skin Dive (Warner Bros, 1985)
 Barefoot on the Beach (Windham Hill, 1999)

 With French Toast 
 French Toast (Electric Bird, 1984)

 With The Friends of Distinction 
 Reviviscence "Live To Light Again" (RCA Victor, 1975)

 With David Friesen 
 Star Dance (Inner City, 1976)

 With Tomo Fujita 
 Pure (Tomo Fujita, 2010)

 With Jun Fukamachi 
 The Sea of Dirac (Kitty Records, 1977) 
 Evening Star (Kitty Records, 1978)
 On The Move (Alfa, 1978)
 Live (credited as: & the New York All Stars) (Alfa, 1978)

 With Funk Factory 
 Funk Factory (ATCO/Atlantic, 1975) (Tracks "Watusi Dance", "Rien Ne Va Plus", "Funk It" and "Lilliput")

 With Fuse One 
 Ice (GNP Crescendo Record Co, 1984)

 With Peter Gabriel 
 OVO (Real World, 2000) 
 Up (Geffen, 2002)

 With Eric Gale
 Ginseng Woman (Columbia, 1977)
 Multiplication (Columbia, 1978) 
 Part of You (Columbia, 1979)

 With David Garfield and Friends 
 Tribute to Jeff Porcaro (Zebra Records, 1997)

 With Art Garfunkel 
 Watermark (Columbia, 1977)  
 Fate for Breakfast (Columbia, 1979)
 Lefty (Columbia, 1988)
 Songs from a Parent to a Child (Columbia, 1997)
 Some Enchanted Evening (Atco, 2007)

 With Art Garfunkel & Amy Grant 
 The Animals' Christmas (Columbia, 1986)

 With Joey George & Lewis McGehee 
 Joey George & Lewis McGehee (Lifesong, 1976)

 With Donny Gerrard 
 The Romantic (Frequency Records, 1999)

 With Giorgio 
 Giorgio's Party of the Century (Lettera, 2010)

 With Nikki Giovanni 
 The Way I Feel (Niktom, 1975)

 With Eddie Gómez 
 Gomez (Interface, 1984)
 Mezgo (aka Discovery) (Epic, 1986)
 Power Play (Columbia, 1988)
 Street Smart (Columbia, 1989)

 With Stéphane Grappelli 
 Uptown Dance (Columbia, 1978)

 With Mark Gray 
 Boogie Hotel (TDK Records, 1982)
 The Silencer (Credited as Mark Gray and Superfriends) (Eastworld, 1984)

 With Ellie Greenwich 
 Let it be written let it be sung (Verve, 1973)

 With Henry Gross 
 Henry Gross (A&M Records, 1973)
 Release (Lifesong, 1976)

 With Dave Grusin 
 One of a Kind (Polydor, 1977)  
 Out of the Shadows (GRP, 1982)
 Dave Grusin and the NY-LA Dream Band (GRP, 1984) 
 The Orchestral Album (GRP, 1994)

 With Don Grusin 
 Laguna Cove (Award Records, 1998)

 With Wlodek Gulgowski 
 Soundcheck (Polydor, 1976)

 With Jim Hall 
 Concierto (CTI, 1975)

 With John Hall John Hall (Asylum Records, 1978)

 With Johnny Hammond Higher Ground (Kudu, 1973)

 With Richard Harris 
 The Prophet (Atlantic, 1974)

 With Richie Havens 
 Connections (Elecktra, 1980)

 With Michael Lee Hill 
 Music From Here to Andromeda (Izon Sky/Moment Point, 2007)

 With Terumasa Hino 
 Daydream (Flying Disk/Inner City Records, 1980)
 ベスト・コレクション" (JVC, 1990)

 With Jennifer Holliday 
 Say You Love Me (Geffen, 1985) 
 Get Close to My Love (Geffen, 1987)

 With Loleatta Holloway 
 Queen of the Night (Gold Mind, 1978)
 Love Sensation (Gold Mind, 1980)

 With Freddie Hubbard 
 Windjammer (Columbia, 1976)

 With Bobbi Humphrey 
 Freestyle (Epic, 1978)

 With Janis Ian 
 Janis Ian (Columbia, 1978)
 Night Rains (Columbia, 1979)
 Revenge (Beacon Records, 1995)
 God & The FBI (Windham Hill Records, 2000)

 With Masaru Imada 
 A Day in the Paradise (Full House, 1983)

 With Kimiko Itoh 
 For Lovers Only (A Touch/Columbia, 1987)
 Follow Me (A Touch/Columbia, 1989)
 A Natural Woman (A Touch, 1990)
 Sophisticated Lady (Videoarts Music, 1995)
 An Evening With Kimiko Itoh - Live Concert in New York (Platinum Records, 2007)

 With Weldon Irvine 
 Sinbad (RCA, 1976)

 With Eileen Ivers 
 Crossing the Bridge (Sony Classical, 1999)

 With Jackie and Roy 
 A Wilder Alias (CTI, 1974)

 With Milt Jackson 
 Goodbye (CTI, 1973)

 With Bob James 
 One (CTI, 1974)
 Two (CTI, 1975)
 BJ4 (CTI, 1977)
 Heads (Tappan Zee Records, 1977)
 Touchdown (Zappan Tee, 1978)
 Lucky Seven (Tracks "Rush Hour" and "Blue Lick") (Zappan Tee, 1979)
 All Around the Town (Zappan Tee Records, 1981)
 Foxie (Zappan Tee Records, 1983) 
 The Genie: Themes & Variations from the TV series TAXI (Tappan Zee Records/Columbia, 1983) 
 Playin' Hooky (Warner Bros, 1997)
 These are the CTI Years: Live in Japan (Wildlife Records, 2012)

 With Bob James & David Sanborn 
 Double Vision (Warner Bros, 1986)
 Quartette Humaine (Okeh, 2013)

 With Al Jarreau 
 This Time (Warner Bros, 1980)
 Breakin' Away (Warner Bros, 1981)
 Jarreau (Warner Bros, 1983)
 Tenderness (Reprise Records, 1994)
 Tomorrow Today (GRP, 2000) 
 Live at Montreux 1993 (Eagle Records, 2016)

 With Garland Jeffreys 
 Ghost Writer (A&M, 1977)
 One-Eyed Jack (A&M, 1978)

 With Joe and Bing 
 Joe and Bing (RCA, 1976)

 With Dr. John 
 "City Lights" (A&M, 1978)Tango Palace (Horizon, 1979)

 With Gordon Johnson 
 "Trios 3.0" (tracks 5 & 10) (Tonalities, 2004)

 With Michel Jonasz 
 Oú Est La Source (WEA, 1992) 
 Michel Jonasz au Zénith (WEA, 1993)
 Où vont les rêves (Capitol Records, 2002)

 With Jill Jones 
 Jill Jones (Paisley Park, Warner Bros, 1987)

 With Rickie Lee Jones 
 Rickie Lee Jones (Warner Bros, 1979) 
 Pirates (Warner Bros, 1981)
 The Magazine (Warner Bros. 1984)

 With Quincy Jones 
 Sounds...and Stuff Like That!! (A&M, 1978)
 Q's Jook Joint (Quest, Warner Bros, 1995)

 With Salena Jones 
 My Love (JVC, 1981)

 With The Joneses 
 Keepin' Up With The Joneses (Mercury, 1974)
 Our Love Long (P-Vine Records, 1992)
 Come Back To Me (P-Vine Records, 1993)

 With Margie Joseph 
 Margie (Atlantic, 1975)

 With Toshiki Kadomatsu 
 Reasons for Thousand Lovers (OM, 1989)

 With Jean-Michel Kajdan 
 Blue Noise (Track "Stevabe") (Blue Citron, 1992)

 With Karen Kamon 
 Heart of You (CBS/Columbia, 1984)

 With Steve Khan 
 Tightrope (Tappan Zee Records/Columbia, 1977)
 The Blue Man (CBS, 1978)
 Arrows (Columbia, 1979)

 With B.B. King and Eric Clapton 
 Riding with the King (Duck/Reprise, 2000)

 With Rahsaan Roland Kirk 
 The Case of the 3 Sided Dream in Audio Color (Atlantic, 1975)

 With Earl Klugh 
 Living inside Your Love (Blue Note, 1976)  
 Finger Paintings (Blue Note, 1977)

 With Gladys Knight & the Pips 
 2nd Anniversary (Buddah Records, 1975)
 Still Together (Buddah Records, 1977)
 The One and Only (Buddah Records, 1978)

 With Davy Knowles & Back Door Slam 
 Coming Up for Air (only on bonus track "Taste of Danger") (Blix Street Records, 2009)

 With John Krondes and The Hit Making Team 
 The End A New Beginning (Funky Sound of America, 2009)

 With Ai Kuwabara 
 Somehow, Someday, Somewhere (T.O.M. RECORDS, 2017) 
 Live at the Blue Note (Verve, 2019)

 With L'Image 
 L'Image 2.0 (L'Image Records, 2009)

 With Bill LaBounty 
 Bill LaBounty (Warner Bros/Curb Records, 1982)

 With Abraham Laboriel 
 Dear Friends (Bluemoon Recordings, 1993)

 With Nils Landgren 
 The Moon the Stars and You (ACT, 2011)

 With Neil Larsen 
 High Gear (Horizon, A&M, 1979)

 With Yusef Lateef In a Temple Garden (CTI, 1979)

 With Yusef Lateef with Art Farmer 
 Autophysiopsychic (CTI, 1977)

 With Mike Lawrence 
 Nightwind (Credited as Mike Lawrence with Herbie Hancock & Bob James) (Optimism Incorporated, 1987)

 With Hubert Laws 
 In the Beginning (The tracks on this album were additionally released separately as Then there was light Vol 1 and Vol 2) (CTI, 1974)
 The Chicago Theme (CTI, 1974)
 Romeo & Juliet (Columbia, 1976)

 With Will Lee 
 Oh! (Go Jazz, 1995)
 Love Gratitude and other Distractions (CD Baby/Sinning Saint, 2013)

 With Levin Brothers 
 Levin Brothers (Lazy Bones Recordings, 2014)

 With O'Donel Levy 
 Simba (Groove Merchant, 1974)

 With Dave Liebman 
 What It Is (Columbia, 1980)

 With Didier Lockwood 
 Storyboard (Dreyfus, 1996)

 With Chuck Loeb 
 Silhouette (track Lockdown) (Shanachie, 2013)

 With Kenny Loggins 
 Celebrate Me Home (Columbia, 1977)

 With Gloria Loring 
 Gloria Loring (Atlantic, 1986)

 With Love Childs Afro Cuban Blues Band 
 Spandisco (Midsong International, 1977)

 With Jon Lucien 
 Premonition (Precision, 1980)

 With Elliot Lurie 
 Elliot Lurie (Epic, 1975)

 With Paul McCartney 
 Tug of War (Parlaphone/EMI, 1982)
 Pipes of Peace (Parlophone UK, Columbia US, 1983)

 With Van McCoy 
 Disco Baby (credited to Van McCoy & the Soul City Symphony) (Avco, 1975)
 The Disco Kid (Buddah, 1975)
 The Real McCoy (H&L Records, 1976)
 Rhythms of the World (H&L, 1976)
 My Favorite Fantasy (MCA Records, 1978)

 With Michael McDonald 
 If Thats's What It Takes (Warner Bros, 1982)

 With Ralph MacDonald 
 The Path (Marlin, 1978)
 Counterpoint (Marlin, 1979)
 Universal Rhythm (Polydor, 1984)
 Surprize (Polydor, 1985)
 Port Pleasure (Videoarts Music, 1998)

 With Teo Macero 
 Impressions of Virus (Columbia, 1980)
 Virus (Original Soundtrack) (Columbia, 1980)
 Impressions of Miles Davis (Orchard, 2001)

 With Kate & Anna McGarrigle 
 Kate & Anna McGarrigle (Warner Bros, 1976)
 Dancer with Bruised Knees (Warner Bros, 1977)
 Pronto Monto (Warner Bros, 1978)
 French Record (Kébec-Disc/Hannibal, 1980)

 With Colleen McNabb 
 Don't Go To Strangers (Track 4 only) (Zucca Records, 2009)

 With Bob Malach 
 Mood Swing (GoJazz, 1990)

 With Mike Mainieri 
 Love Play (Arista, 1977)

 With Melissa Manchester 
 Singin' (Arista, 1977)

 With Chuck Mangione 
 Friends and Love (Mercury, 1970)
 Together: A New Chuck Mangione Concert (Mercury, 1971)
 Alive! (Mercury, 1972)
 Land of Make Believe (Mercury, 1973)
 Main Squeeze (A&M Records, 1976)
 Tarantella (A&M Records, 1980)
 70 Miles Young (A&M Records, 1982)
 Disguise (Columbia, 1984) 
 The Boys from Rochester (Feels So Good Records, 1989)
 Together Forever (Gates Music, 1994)
 The Hat's Back (Chuck Mangione, 1994)

 With Gap Mangione 
 Diana in the Autumn Wind (GRC, 1968)
 Sing Along Junk (Mercury, 1972)
 She and I (A&M, 1974)
 Gap Mangione! (A&M Records, 1976)
 Planet Gap (Josh Music Inc, 1998)
 Stolen Moments (Josh Music Inc, 2003) 
 Family Holidays (Josh Music Inc, 2004)

 With José Mangual 
 Buyú (Turnstyle Records, 1977)

 With Manhattan Jazz Quintet 
 Manhattan Jazz Quintet (King, 1984)
 Autumn Leaves (King, 1985)
 My Funny Valentine (King, 1985)
 The Sidewinder (King, 1986)
 Live at Pit Inn (Paddle Wheel, 1986)
 Live at the Pit Inn Vol 2 (King, 1986)
 My Favourite Things Live in Tokyo (King, 1987)
 Manhattan Jazz Quintet Reunion - Manhattan Blues (Sweet Basil, 1990)
 Concierto De Aranjuez (Sweet Basil, 1994)
 V.S.O.P. (Very Special Onetime Performance) (Birds Records, 2008)

 With The Manhattan Transfer 
 Pastiche (Atlantic, 1978) 
 Mecca for Moderns (Atlantic, 1981)

 With Barry Manilow Barry Manilow (Bell, 1973)

 With Herbie Mann First Light as The Family of Mann (Atlantic, 1974)Discothèque (Atlantic, 1975)Waterbed (Atlantic, 1975)Surprises (Atlantic, 1976)Gagaku & Beyond (Finnadar/Atlantic, 1974 [1976])
 Sunbelt (Atlantic, 1979)

 With Manzanera & Mackay 
 Crack the Whip (Relativity, 1988)
 Up In Smoke (Relativity, 1989)

 With Steve Marcus Some Time Other Than Now (Flying Dutchman, 1976)

 With Arif Mardin 
 Journey (Atlantic, 1974)

 With Tania Maria 
 The Lady from Brazil (Manhattan Records, 1986)
 Forbidden Colors (Capitol Records, 1988)
 Bluesilian (TKM Records, 1996)
 Europe (New Note, 1997)
 Bela Vista (World Pacific Records, 1990)

 With Mark-Almond 
 Other Peoples Rooms (Horizon, 1978)

 With Hirth Martinez 
 Big Bright Street (Warner Bros, 1977)

 With The Pedrito Martinez Group 
 The Pedro Martinez Group (Motéma, 2013)

 With Yoshiaki Masuo 
 Sailing Wonder (Electric Bird, 1978)

 With Sleepy Matsumoto with N.Y. First Calls 
 Papillon (Compose, 1992)

 With David Matthews 
 Dune (CTI, 1977)
 Grand Cross (Electric Bird, 1981)
 American Pie (Credited to David Matthews Trio) (Sweet Basil, 1990)
 Without You (Credited to David Matthews & The Masters) (Absorb Music Japan, 2003)
 Sir, (Paddle Wheel, 2018)

 With Lyle Mays 
 Street Dreams (Geffen, 1988)

 With Meco 
 Star Wars and Other Galactic Funk (Millenium Records, 1977)

 With Lesley Meguid 
 The Truth About Love Songs (Muve Recordings, 2010)

 With Sérgio Mendes 
 Sérgio Mendes and the New Brazil '77 (Elektra, 1977)

 With Bette Midler 
 Bette Midler (Atlantic, 1973)
 Songs for the New Depression (Atlantic, 1976)

 With Barry Miles 
 Magic Theater (London, 1975)

 With Adam Miller Westwind Circus (Chelsea Records, 1974)

 With Charles Mingus 
 Me, Myself An Eye With Bob Mintzer 
 Bop Boy (2002)

 With Eddy Mitchell 
 Le Cimetiére Des Eléphants (Barclay/RCA, 1982)

 With Melba Moore 
 Peach Melba (Buddah, 1975)
 This Is It (Buddah, 1976)
 Melba (1976 album) (Buddah, 1976)

 Russell Morris Turn It On (RCA Records, Wizard Records, 1976)

 With Chris Mostert 
 Midnight Breeze (Rhombus Records, 2004)

 With Shigeharu Mukai 
 Pleasure (Better Days, 1980)

 With Teruo Nakamura 
 Big Apple (credited to Teruo Nakamura Rising Sun Band) (Agharta, 1979)
 Super Friends (Eastworld, 1985)

 With The New York Community Choir 
 The New York Community Choir (RCA Victor, 1977)
 Make Every Day Count (RCA Victor, 1978)

 With Nighthawks 
 Metro Bar (Call It Anything, 2001)

 With Claus Ogerman & Michael Brecker 
 Cityscape (Warner Bros, 1982)

 With Yoshiyuki Ohsawa 
 Serious Barbarian II (Track 8  only) (Epic, 1989)

 With Mica Okudoi 
 What a Difference (Leads Entertainment, 2009)

 With Susan Osborn 
 Signature (Orchard, 2000)

 With Eddie Palmieri 
 Unfinished Masterpiece (Coco, 1975)
 Exploration - Salsa-Descarga-Jazz (track "Ressemblance") (Coco Records, 1978)

 With Jackie Paris & Anne Marie Moss 
 Live at the Maisonette (Differant Drummer Records, 1975)

 With Luciano Pavarotti & Friends 
 Pavarotti & Friends for the Children of Liberia (Decca, 1998)
 Pavarotti & Friends for Cambodia and Tibet (Decca, 2000)

 With Peter, Paul and Mary 
 Reunion (Warner Bros, 1978)

 With Michel Petrucciani 
 Both Worlds (Dreyfus, 1997)
 Trio in Tokyo (Dreyfus, 1999)
 Both Worlds Live - North Sea Jazz Festival (Dreyfus, 2016)

 With Esther Phillips 
 Performance (Kudu/CTI, 1974)
 Capricorn Princess (Kudu/CTI, 1976)

 With Noel Pointer 
 Phantazia (Blue Note, 1977)
 Hold On (United Artists Records, 1978)

 With Mike Porcaro 
 Brotherly Love (Creatchy Records, 2011) (Tracks "Rosanna", "Manic Depression", "Georgy Porgy", "Lowdown", "E Minor Shuffle", "Human Nature", "Africa", "Let's Stay Together", "Stuffy", "Jeff's Strut" and "Corbitt Van Brauer")

 With Andy Pratt 
 Resolution (Nemporer, 1976)

 With Rainbow Featuring Will Boulware 
 Crystal Green (Inner City Records, 1978)
 Over Crystal Green (credited to Will & Rainbow) (Eighty-Eight's, 2002)
 Harmony (credited to Will & Rainbow) (Eighty-Eight's, 2003)

 With Bonnie Raitt 
 Streetlights (Warner Bros, 1974)

 With Elliott Randall 
 Elliott Randall's New York (Kirshner, 1977)

 With Pat Rebillot 
 Free Fall (Atlantic, 1974)

 With Leon Redbone 
 On the Track (Warner Bros, 1975)

 With Buddy Rich Big Band 
 Burning for Buddy: A Tribute to the Music of Buddy Rich (Atlantic, 1994)
 Burning for Buddy A Tribute to the Music of Buddy Rich Volume II (Atlantic, 1997)

 With Jeff Richman 
 Big Wheel (Nefer Records, 2013)

 With Lee Ritenour 
 Friendship (Jasrac, 1978)
 The Captain's Journey (Elektra, 1978)
 Feel the Night (Elektra, 1979)
 Wes Bound (appears on bonus track N.Y.Time - #11) (GRP, 1993)

 With Diana Ross 
 Eaten Alive (RCA, 1985)
 Red Hot Rhythm & Blues (EMI UK, RCA US, 1987)

 With Professor RJ Ross 
 Face to Face (Latana Records/Media Force Music Group, 2008)

 With Michael Ruff 
 Once In A Lifetime (Warner Bros, 1984)
 You Are My Song (Ruff Mix Music, 2012)

 With David Ruffin 
 Who I Am (Motown, 1975)
 Everything's Coming Up Love (Motown, 1976)
 In My Stride (Motown, 1977)

 With Bridget St John 
 Take the 5ifth (The Road Goes on Forever, 1996)

 With William Salter 
 It Is So Beautiful To Be (Marlin, RCA, 1977)

 With Sergio Salvatore 
 Point of Presence (N2K Encoded Music, 1997)

 With Joe Sample 
 The Hunter (MCA, 1983)
 Did You Feel That? (Warner Bros, 1994)
 Sample This (Warner Bros, 1997)
 "No regrets" (PRA, 2009)
 "Children of the Sun" (and the NDR Big Band) (PRA, 2014)

 With David Sanborn 
 Taking Off (Warner Bros, 1975)
 Heart to Heart (Warner Bros, 1978)  
 Hideaway (Warner Bros, 1980) 
 Voyeur (Warner Bros, 1981) 
 Backstreet (Warner Bros, 1983) 
 Taking Off (Warner Bros, 1985)
 A Change of Heart (Warner Bros, 1987)
 Pearls (Elektra, 1995)
 Time Again (Verve, 2003)
 Closer (Verve Records, 2004)
 Here and Gone (Decca, 2008) 
 Only Everything (Decca, 2010)

 With Ida Sand 
 The Gospel Truth (ACT, 2011)

 With Mongo Santamaría 
 Red Hot (Zappan Tee Records/Columbia, 1979)

 With Philippe Sarde 
 Hors-La-Loi (Soundtrack from the film by Robin Davis) (Carrere, 1985)

 With Masahiko Satoh 
 As If... (Nippon/Columbia, 1985) 
 Amorphism (Portrait, 1986)
 Double Exposure (Epic/Sony Atuh, 1988)

 With Leo Sayer 
 Endless Flight (Chrysalis UK, Warner Bros US, 1976)

 With Lalo Schifrin Towering Toccata (CTI, 1976)

 With Diane Schuur Talkin' 'bout You (GRP, 1988)

 With Tom Scott 
 New York Connection (Ode, 1975)
 Blow It Out (Ode, 1977)
 Intimate Strangers (Columbia, 1978) 
 Apple Juice (CBS, 1981)
 Bluestreak (Credited to Tom Scott and the L.A. Express) (GRP, 1996) 
 Canon Re-loaded (Concord Jazz, 2008)

 With John Sebastian 
 Tar Beach (Shanachie, 1993)

 With Don Sebesky The Rape of El Morro (CTI, 1975)

 With Daniel Seff 
 Vol De Nuit (Track "Bill" only) (CBS, 1984)

 With Paul Shaffer 
 Coast to Coast (Track "One Cup of Coffee") (Capitol Records, 1989)

 With Howard Shore 
 The Last Mimzy (Original motion picture soundtrack) (New Line Records, 2007)

 With Ben Sidran The Cat and the Hat (Horizon, 1979)

 With Janis Siegel 
 Experiment in White (Atlantic, 1982)

 With Carly Simon 
 Boys in the Trees (Elektra, 1978)
 Spy (Elektra, 1979)
 Come Upstairs (Warner Bros, 1980) 
 My Romance (Arista, 1990)
 Have You Seen Me Lately? (Arista, 1990)
 The Bedroom Tapes (Arista, 2000)
 This Kind of Love (Track "Sangre Dolce") (Hear Music, 2008)

 With Harper Simon 
 Harper Simon (Tulsi Records/Vagrant, 2009)

 With Lucy Simon 
 Lucy Simon (RCA Victor, 1975)
 Stolen Time (RCA, 1977)

 With Simon and Garfunkel 
 The Concert in Central Park (Warner Bros, 1982)

 With Paul Simon 
 Still Crazy After All These Years (track "50 Ways to Leave Your Lover") (Columbia, 1975)
 One-Trick Pony (Warner Bros, 1980)
 Hearts and Bones (Warner Bros, 1983) 
 Graceland (Warner Bros, 1986)
 The Rhythm Of The Saints (Warner Bros, 1990) 
 You're the One (Warner Bros, 2000)
 Paul Simon's Concert in the Park, August 15, 1991 (Warner Bros, 1991)
 Surprise (Warner Bros, 2006)
 In the Blue Light (Legacy, 2018)

 With Frank Sinatra 
 L.A. Is My Lady (Qwest, Warner Bros, 1984)

 With SMAP 
 008 Tacomax (Victor, 1996)

 With Smappies 
 Smappies II (Victor, 1999)

 With Lonnie Smith 
 Funk Reaction (Lester Radio Corporation, 1977)

 With Andy Snitzer 
 Ties That Bind (Reprise, 1994)

 With Phoebe Snow 
 Second Childhood (Columbia, 1976)
 Never Letting Go (Columbia, 1977)

 With Christoph Spendel 
 Spendel (L+R Records, 1989)

 With Spyro Gyra 
 Incognito (MCA, 1982)
 City Kids (MCA, 1983)

 With Stardrive Intergalactic Trot (Elektra, 1973)

 With Ringo Starr 
 Ringo the 4th (Atlantic US, Polydor UK, 1977) 
 
 With Steely Dan 
 Aja (on "Aja") (ABC, 1977) 
 Gaucho (on "Glamour Profession", "My Rival", "Third World Man", and percussion on "Hey Nineteen") (MCA, 1980)

 With Jeremy Steig Firefly (CTI, 1977)Rain Forest with Eddie Gómez (CMP, 1980)

 With Steps Ahead 
 Step by Step (Better Days, 1981)  
 Smokin' in the Pit (Better Days, 1981)

 With Joss Stone 
 Colour Me Free! (EMI, 2009)

 With Street Corner Symphony 
 Harmony Grits (Bang Records, 1975)

 With Barbra Streisand 
 Guilty (Columbia, 1980)

 With Stuff 
 Stuff (Warner Bros, 1976)
 More Stuff (Warner Bros, 1977) 
 Stuff It (Warner Bros, 1978)
 Live Stuff (Warner Bros, 1978)
 Live in New York (Warner Bros, 1980)
 Made in America (A remembrance of Richard Tee) (Bridge Gate, 1994))
 Live At Montreux 1976 (Eagle Records, 2008)

 With Sunlightsquare 
 Urban Sessions (Sunlightsquare Records, 2006)

 With Yoshio Suzuki 
 The Moment (Videoarts Music, 1992)

 With The Sylvers 
 New Horizons (Capitol, 1977)
 Forever Yours (Casablanca, 1978)

 With Grady Tate 
 Master Grady Tate (ABC Impulse!, 1977)

 With James Taylor 
 New Moon Shine (Columbia, 1991), on "Everybody Loves To Cha-Cha"
 October Road (Columbia, 2002)
 James Taylor at Christmas (Columbia, 2006) 
 Covers (Hear Music, 2008) 
 Other Covers (Hear Music, 2009)
 Before This World (Concord, 2015)
 American Standard (Fantasy, 2020)

 With Kate Taylor 
 Kate Taylor (CBS, 1978)

 With Livingston Taylor 
 There You Are Again (Chesky Record/Whistling Dog Music, 2006) 
 Last Alaska Moon (Chesky, 2010)

 With Richard Tee 
 Strokin (Tappan Zee/Columbia, 1979)
 Natural Ingredients (Tappan Zee/CBS, 1980)
 The Bottom Line (Electric Bird)
 Inside You (Epic/Sony, 1989)
 Real Time (One Voice, 1995)
 Real Time Live in Concert 1992 (Videoarts Music, 2012)

 With Joe Thomas Masada (Groove Merchant, 1975)Feelin's from Within (Groove Merchant, 1976)

 With Tonto It's About Time (Polydor, 1974)

 With Carol Townes and Fifth Avenue 
 Carol Townes and Fifth Avenue (Sixth Avenue, 1976)

 With Mary Travers 
 It's in Everyone Of Us (Chrysalis, 1978)

 With John Tropea 
 Tropea (Marlin, 1975)
 Short Trip to Space (Marlin, 1977)
 To Touch You Again (Marlin, 1979)
 NY Cats Direct (DMP, 1986)
 Live at Mikell's New York (Videoarts Music, 1994)
 Something Old New Borrowed And Blue (Videoarts Music, 1999)
 A Simple Way To Say I Love You (Digital Dimension, 1999)
 Standard Influence (Videoarts Music, 2003)
 Rock Candy - Standard Influence II (Videoarts Music, 2006)
 Take Me Back To The Ol' School (CD Baby, 2007)
 Tropea 10 The Time is Right (Video Arts, 2007)
 Gotcha Rhythm Right Here (on Track "Hip to the Hips") (Savoy Records, 2014)

 With Jeff Tyzik 
 Radiance (Capitol Records, 1982)
 The Farthest Corner of My Mind (Amherst Records, 1986)

 With Phil Upchurch 
 Phil Upchurch (Marlin/TK Records, 1978)

 With Phil Upchurch & Tennyson Stephens 
 Upchurch/Tennyson (Kudu, 1975)

 With Michal Urbaniak 
 Fusion III (CBS/Columbia, 1975)

 With Dave Valentin 
 Legends (GRP, 1979)

 With Gus Vali 
 Chimera (Peters International, 1974)

 With Frankie Valli 
 Lady Put the Light Out (Private Stock, 1977)

 With Kenny Vance 
 Vance 32 (Atlantic, 1975)

 With Ornella Vanoni 
 Ornella &... (CGD, 1986)

 With Various Artists 
 The Wiz (soundtrack) (MCA, 1978)
 Music from the motion picture Lethal Weapon 3 (Track 1 only) (Reprise, 1992)
 The Bridge School Concerts Vol 1 (Warner Bros/Reprise, 1997)
 Celebrating the Music of Weather Report (Track 6 only) (Telarc, 2000)
 The Wild Thornberrys Movie Soundtrack (Jive/BMG Sony Music, 2002)
 Cannon Re*Loaded (All-Star Celebration of Cannonball Adderley) (Concord Jazz, 2008)

 With Harold Vick 
 After the Dance (Wolf Records, 1977)

 With John Wackerman 
 Drum Duets Vol. 1 (On track 1 only "Manic Depression") (Eyeperian, 2007)

 With Randy Waldman 
 SuperHeros (BFM Jazz, 2018)

 With Cedar Walton Mobius (RCA, 1975)

 With Dionne Warwick 
 Friends in Love (Arista, 1982)
 Heartbreaker (Arista, 1982)

 With Grover Washington, Jr. 
 Feels So Good (Kudu, 1975)  
 Winelight (Elektra/Asylum, 1980)
 Come Morning (Elektra/Asylum, 1980)
 Inside Moves (Elektra, 1984)
 A House Full of Love (Columbia, 1986)
 Soulful Strut (Columbia, 1996)

 With Sadao Watanabe 
 Morning Island (Flying Disk, ProJazz, 1979)
 How's Everything (Columbia, 1980) 
 Fill up the Night (Elektra, 1983)
 Rendezvous (Elektra, 1984)
 Earth Step (Verve Forecast, 1994)
 Sadao 2019 Live At Blue Note Tokyo (JVC, 2019)

 With Bill Watrous 
 Bone Straight Ahead (Credited as Bill Watrous Combo with Danny Stiles) (Famous Door, 1973)

 With Weather Report 
 Mr. Gone (Columbia, 1978) (Tracks "Young and Fine" and "And Then")

 With The Webb Sisters 
 Daylight Crossing (Mercury, 2006)

 With Frank Weber 
 As The Time Flies (RCA Victor, 1978)

 With Dave Weckl 
 Master Plan (On track 8 only - Master Plan) (GRP, 1990)

 With Fred Wesley & the J.B.'s 
 The Lost Album (Hip-O Select, 2011)

 With White Elephant 
 White Elephant (Just Sunshine Records, 1972)

 With Whitren & Cartwright 
 Rhythm Hymn (Elektra, 1983)

 With David Wilcox 
 Big Horizon (A&M Records, 1994)

 With Patrick Williams New York Band 
 10th Avenue (Soundwings, 1987)

 With Nancy Wilson 
 This Mother's Daughter (Capitol, 1976) 
 Nancy Now! (Columbia, 1988)

 With Paul Winter 
 Common Ground (A&M, 1978) 
 Concert for the Earth (credited as Paul Winter Consort) (Living Music, 1985) 
 Whales Alive (credited as Paul Winter & Paul Halley ) (Track 8 - Ocean Dream) (Living Music, 1987)

 With Philippé Wynne 
 Starting All Over (Cotillion, 1977)

 With Akiko Yano 
 Home on the Range (uncertain translation of Japanese title!) (Midi Inc, 1986)

 With Yutaka Yokokura 
 Love Light (Alfa, 1978)

 With Zawose & Brook 
 Assembly (Narada, 2001)

 With Ratko Zjaca 
 Continental Talk'' (In+Out Records, 2009)

References 

Discographies of American artists
Jazz discographies